Hi-Tek is an American rapper and record producer.

Hi-Tek also refers to:
 Hi-Tek Corporation, a defunct American keyboard manufacturer
 DJ Hi-Tek, a member of Die Antwoord

See also
 Hi-Tek incident, a series of protests in Little Saigon, Orange County, California
 Hi-Tekk, a member of La Caution
 Hi-Tek 3, pseudonym of Ya Kid K
 Hy-Tek Hurricane 103